BCP-1 cells are a clonal lymphoma cell line. They were derived from the peripheral blood mononuclear cells of an HIV seronegative patient with a body cavity based primary effusion lymphoma (PEL). BCP-1 cells are positive for KSHV, but negative for EBV. The cell line is used extensively for KSHV serologic assays and epidemiologic studies as well as other KSHV laboratory studies such as KSHV reactivation from latency with TPA or ectopic expression of KSHV ORF 50. BCP-1 has been deposited to ATCC by the creators for public use in research: https://web.archive.org/web/20070929090610/http://www.atcc.org/common/catalog/numSearch/numResults.cfm?atccNum=CRL-2294.

References and notes

External links
Cellosaurus entry for BCP-1

Virology
Human cell lines